Moniga, or Makhuwa-Moniga, is a Bantu language spoken by a quarter million Makua people in Mozambique. It is closely related to Cuabo.

References

Makua languages
Languages of Mozambique